Julius A. Dargan House (also known as the Kollock-Stone House) is a historic house located at 488 Pearl Street in Darlington, Darlington County, South Carolina.

Description and history 
It was built about 1856, and is a rectangular, two-story weatherboarded Greek Revival style residence with interior stuccoed chimneys. It has a hipped roof and a two-tiered, pedimented portico with four square, paneled columns on each floor. It was the home of Julius Alfred Dargan (1815-1861) a lawyer, a member of the House of Representatives, a trustee of the Darlington Academy, and a signer of the Ordinance of Secession in 1860.

It was listed on the National Register of Historic Places on February 10, 1988.

References

Houses on the National Register of Historic Places in South Carolina
Greek Revival houses in South Carolina
Houses completed in 1856
Houses in Darlington County, South Carolina
National Register of Historic Places in Darlington County, South Carolina
Darlington, South Carolina